Leeds North East is a constituency which has been represented in the House of Commons of the UK Parliament since 1997 by Fabian Hamilton of the Labour Party.

Boundaries 

1918–1950: The County Borough of Leeds wards of Crossgates, Roundhay, Seacroft, and Shadwell, and parts of the wards of North and North East.

1950–1955: The County Borough of Leeds wards of Burmantofts, Harehills, Potternewton, and Richmond Hill.

1955–1974: The County Borough of Leeds wards of Chapel Allerton, Potternewton, Roundhay, and Woodhouse.

1974–1983: The City of Leeds wards of Chapel Allerton, Harehills, Roundhay, Scott Hall, and Talbot.

1983–2010: The City of Leeds wards of Chapel Allerton, Moortown, North, and Roundhay.

2010–present: The City of Leeds wards of Alwoodley, Chapel Allerton, Moortown, and Roundhay.

History of boundaries
A North-East division of Leeds's parliamentary borough was recommended by the Boundary Commission in its report of 1917. The Commission recommended that the division consist of the whole of the Crossgates, Roundhay, Seacroft, and Shadwell wards, together with the larger parts of two other wards which were to be divided between divisions: North-East ward save for a small part west of Accommodation Road in Burmantofts which was placed in the South-East division and that part of North ward east of Gledhow Park and Moor Allerton. This created a division with a population of 74,054 (according to the 1911 Census); 38,307 lived in the part of North ward, 28,349 in the part of North-East ward, and 7,398 in Roundhay, Seacroft, Shadwell and Cross Gates. Parliament enacted the new boundaries without alteration in the Representation of the People Act 1918.

The initial report of the Boundary Commission in 1947 recommended that the North East division consist of the Burmantofts, Harehills, Potternewton and Roundhay wards. This meant a slightly smaller electorate (in respect of the register in force on 15 October 1946) from 78,498 to a still hefty 66,671; the main change was the removal of Seacroft to the South East division. The Government brought in a Representation of the People Bill based on the recommendations, but after pressure from some affected local authorities, decided give extra seats to some towns and cities where the electorate had resulted in the area narrowly missing out on an additional Member: on 18 March 1948 the Government put down amendments to the Bill which included increasing the number of seats in the County Borough of Leeds from six to seven. The Boundary Commission produced revised recommendations contained the wards of Burmantofts, Harehills and Roundhay, and having an electorate of 51,181. The Boundary Commission consulted on their proposals and received objections to the arrangements in the west of the city which led them to revise the recommendations in May 1948. The alterations had knock-on effects on the North East division, which was now recommended to comprise the North, Roundhay and Woodhouse wards for 56,283 electors.

When the Home Secretary James Chuter Ede proposed altering the Bill in line with the altered recommendations, the sitting MP for Leeds North-East Alice Bacon (supported by George Porter, MP for Leeds Central) moved an amendment to alter the name of a division the Boundary Commission had called 'East Central' to 'North East', and altering the division the Boundary Commission had called 'North East' to 'North'. The Government accepted the amendment, as effected in the Representation of the People Act 1948. The Leeds North East division from then consisted of the Burmantofts, Harehills, Potternewton and Richmond Hill wards and had a 1946 electorate of 49,882. The division was considerably smaller in area after changes in 1950.

Alterations in ward boundaries in Leeds on 28 July 1950 led the Boundary Commission to make an interim report on alterations of constituency boundaries in 1951; although the definition of the constituency was the same, the ward changes had a minor impact on the divisional boundaries. In 1954 the Boundary Commission looked again at boundaries, and recommended that the North East division of Leeds consist of the wards of Allerton, Potternewton, Roundhay and Woodhouse. Three out of the four wards (Allerton, Roundhay and Woodhouse wards) came from the abolished Leeds North, while Burmantofts and Harehills wards were removed to Leeds East, and Richmond Hill ward went to Leeds South East.

By the time of the Second Periodical Report of the Boundary Commission in the late 1960s, the wards of the County Borough of Leeds had again been altered. The commission recommended that the Borough Constituency of Leeds North East consist of the wards of Chapel Allerton, Harehills, Roundhay, Scott Hall and Talbot. The change decreased the electorate (on the October 1968 register) slightly from 53,719 to 53,461. These boundary changes took effect from the February 1974 general election. The Third Periodical Review in 1983 initially proposed a Leeds North East County Constituency comprising 33,200 electors out of 60,120 in the existing borough together with half of the previous Leeds North West seat and Harewood and Wetherby from the Barkston Ash seat. At a public inquiry the plans were challenged and the assistant Commissioner recommended that the Leeds North East constituency remain urban and based on the previous seat, comprising Chapel Allerton, Moortown, North and Roundhay wards; this alteration was accepted by the Boundary Commission. The changes still removed 10,000 electors, mostly to Leeds East but some to Leeds Central and Elmet, and brought in 16,000 electors, mostly from Leeds North West and Barkston Ash and a small number from Leeds South East. No changes were made in the Fourth Periodical Review in 1995.
Current boundaries
Boundary changes implemented the Fifth Periodic Review of Westminster constituencies — their final recommendations almost matched initial proposals and so the seat comprises Alwoodley, Chapel Allerton, Moortown and Roundhay — which took effect at the 2010 general election. By these changes, 2,100 electors out of 64,106 in the existing seat were removed to Elmet and Rothwell, while 3,875 were added from Leeds North West, 700 from Leeds Central, and 349 from Leeds East.

Constituency profile 
This is a diverse constituency covering the northern half of the City of Leeds. It was once a Conservative stronghold, represented for thirty-one years by the senior Tory politician and former cabinet minister Keith Joseph that has since 1997 seen relatively strong Labour support as many large Victorian houses have gradually been converted into flats and multiple-occupancy homes, helping them gain the seat in 1997 for the first time since the 1950s, and have held on since.  A year after Hamilton increased his majority in 2001, psephologists Simon Henig and Lewis Baston wrote that it was now possible to think of Labour winning Leeds North East in a general election which it lost. 
The Guardian described the seat in 2010 as:

The seat stretches from the countryside around the Eccup reservoir to the north, through affluent residential suburbs such as Alwoodley, Roundhay, and Moortown, with their large Jewish populations, up-and-coming neighbourhoods popular with young professionals such as Chapel Allerton, down to deprived inner-city areas such as Chapeltown, the centre of Leeds' Afro-Caribbean community.

History
At the first election in 1918, it was decided that a Conservative candidate would receive the Coalition 'coupon' in Leeds North East, as four Liberals had received coupons in other Leeds divisions and Labour was allowed an unopposed return in Leeds South-East. Major John Birchall, the Coalition Conservative candidate, was opposed by Labour Party candidate John Bromley, leader of the Locomotive Engineman's Society. The Times described Bromley as "prone to verbal violence" and with "an unnecessary railway strike in his war service record". A third candidate, Captain W.P. Brigstock, announced himself for the National Party, but was felt to have negligible prospects and did not stand. Birchall won comfortably, and went on to represent the seat until he retired in February 1940. His majority never fell below 4,000.

Birchall's resignation resulted in a by-election in March 1940, Professor J.J. Craik Henderson was nominated as a Conservative. Under the war-time electoral truce no Labour or Liberal candidate stood, but he was opposed by Sydney Allen of the British Union of Fascists who campaigned on an anti-war policy. Henderson won the by-election with 97.1% of the vote. Despite the division's history, Labour went into the 1945 general election with a degree of optimism. As it turned out Professor Craik Henderson could not defend his seat, and Alice Bacon won for Labour on a 22.6% swing.

The constituency with new boundaries at the 1950 election was reckoned to be helpful to Alice Bacon, and therefore likely to be held by Labour. She indeed held the seat at both the 1950 and 1951 general elections.

The complex changes to Leeds' Parliamentary boundaries in 1955, which reduced the city from seven seats to six, particularly affected Leeds North East which was reckoned to be the seat which was abolished. In the event Alice Bacon was selected in Leeds South East, while that seat's sitting MP Denis Healey was selected for the new Leeds East constituency. George Porter, sitting MP for Leeds Central, failed to be selected for any new seat when his constituency was abolished and retired. The new North East division was effectively based on the old North division, and that seat's sitting Conservative MP Osbert Peake came forward as candidate. He was thought to have a slightly less safe seat in the new Leeds North East. Peake won easily, and after he received a peerage, his successor Sir Keith Joseph held on in a 1956 by-election.

Joseph had a relatively safe seat at first but his majority fell in the elections of the 1960s. At the 1970 general election, it was noted that the seat had the highest immigrant population among the constituencies in Leeds, and had also produced the smallest swing to the Conservatives at that election. The 1979 general election saw the constituency swing to Labour, against the national trend; in 1987 it was noted that while the Conservatives had held the seat, they had done poorly in terms of votes.

In the run-up to the 1997 general election, the seat was a target for the Labour Party. The Leeds North East Constituency Labour Party selected Liz Davies, an Islington councillor on the party's left wing, but the Labour Party National Executive Committee refused to endorse her candidacy over connections to the Labour Briefing magazine; her appeal to the Labour Party conference was unsuccessful. The winner of the second selection, Fabian Hamilton, was identified as a Blairite and comfortably gained the seat when the election was called. The result of the 2010 general election saw Hamilton retain the seat, with a further pro-Labour swing in 2015 and a majority of nearly 17,000 in 2017, the largest since Labour gained the seat two decades ago. Although Hamilton's share of the vote fell in 2019, the Conservative share fell further and his majority increased to over 17,000.

Prior to the 2019 General Election, the Labour Party did MRP analysis. During that analysis, they concluded that, under the current circumstances and without any intervention, Leeds North East would change hands to the Liberal Democrats.

Members of Parliament

Elections

Elections in the 2010s

1 The Conservative Party suspended Amjad Bashir on 20 November 2019. He still appeared on ballot papers under the Conservative label, as nominations had closed by the time of the suspension.

Elections in the 2000s

Elections in the 1990s

Elections in the 1980s

Elections in the 1970s

Elections in the 1960s

Elections in the 1950s

Elections in the 1940s

Elections in the 1930s

Elections in the 1920s

Elections in the 1910s

See also 
 List of parliamentary constituencies in West Yorkshire

Notes

References

Parliamentary constituencies in Yorkshire and the Humber
Constituencies of the Parliament of the United Kingdom established in 1918
Politics of Leeds